Tohura Khatun is a Bangladeshi women's footballer who plays as a forward for Bashundhara Kings Women and the Bangladesh women's national football team. She currently also plays for Bangladesh U-19 and Bangladesh U-16 team.

Career

U14
Tohura was a substitute player of 2015 AFC U-14 Girls' Regional (South & Central) Championship winning squad of Bangladesh, but still managed to score one goal against Bhutan. But in the next edition of the tournament, Tohura helped her team to retain the title. She was the top scorer of 2016 AFC U-14 Girls' Regional (South & Central) Championship with 10 goals in just 4 matches.

U15
Tohura was the member of the 2017 SAFF U-15 Women's Championship winning Bangladesh side. She scored a hat-trick against Nepal in the opening match of the tournament, but was injured after the match and could not score any more goals for the rest of the tournament. However, she was still the top scorer of the Bangladesh team, with 3 goals.
Tohura played a vital role for Bangladesh U-15 side to win their first ever invitational overseas trophy in 2018. Bangladesh U-15 girls clinch the title of 2018 Jockey CGI U-15 Youth Football Tournament held in Hong Kong. She ended the four-nation tournament as the highest scorer with 8 goals from 3 matches.

U16
Tohura scored two goals against Iran and UAE during 2017 AFC U-16 Women's Championship qualification. She was also the member of Bangladesh squad at 2017 AFC U-16 Women's Championship.

International goals

Honours

Individual
Bangladesh Women's Football League Best Player: 2020

References

External links
 

2003 births
Living people
Bangladeshi women's footballers
Bangladesh women's international footballers
Bashundhara Kings players
Bangladesh Women's Football League players
Women's association football forwards
People from Mymensingh District
Kalsindur Government Primary School alumni